Klevan (is an urban-type settlement in Rivne Raion (district) of Rivne Oblast (province) in western Ukraine. Its population was 7,470 at the 2001 Ukrainian census. Current population:

History

A settlement on the current territory of Klevan was first founded in the beginning of the 12th century on the banks of the Stubla River, a tributary of the Horyn. At the time, the settlement was named Kolyvan or Kolivan. The first written mention of Klevan appeared in 1458, as a possession of the Czartoryski family. In 1654, the settlement was granted Magdeburg rights and in 1940, the town acquired the status of an urban-type settlement.

As in all cities and towns of the Volhynia, Klevan had a considerable Jewish community, and a Polish guidebook from 1929 described it as a "the Jewish town with a population of 1,300 people". The town was occupied by the Soviets and then the Germans during World War II and in 1941 the local synagogue was burned by the Fascists and the local Jews were exterminated. The Poles continued to live in Klevan until they were evicted by the Soviets during Operation Wisla. Klevan also became the centre of the deployment of national-liberation struggle of the Ukrainian Insurgent Army. In 1979 it had a population of 8,400 people.

Geography
Klevan is accessed via the T1817 and H22 roads, and is located 28.3 km northwest of Rivne and 50.4 kilometres southeast of Lutsk along the H22. Klevan lies on the Stubla River.

Notable landmarks

Klevan contains the ruins of Klevan Castle, whose construction began in 1475 and was eventually completed in 1561. The town also houses the Church of the Annunciation with a bell tower dating back to 1630, as well as the Church of the Nativity, which was built in 1777. There is also Klevan Railway station, which connects the town with the oblast's administrative center Rivne and Kivertsi, as well as a woodworking plant and food-processing facilities.

An industrial railway enclosed by trees, which has become a walkway for lovers known as the Tunnel of Love is also located near Klevan.

People from Klevan
 Michał Fryderyk Czartoryski, Polish–Lithuanian Commonwealth nobleman, Duke of Klewań and

See also
 Kvasyliv and Orzhiv, the other two urban-type settlements in Rivne Raion of Rivne Oblast

References

External links

 Klevan official website

Urban-type settlements in Rivne Raion
Volhynian Governorate
1458 establishments
Populated places established in the 1450s
Shtetls
Holocaust locations in Ukraine
Ukrainian Insurgent Army